Caffin Valley is a cirque-type valley between Mount Bastion and Gibson Spur in the Willett Range, Victoria Land. It was named by the New Zealand Antarctic Place-Names Committee in 1985 after James Maurice Maitland Caffin, New Zealand Antarctic historian who, from 1973–84, was editor of Antarctic, the popular news bulletin published by the New Zealand Antarctic Society.

References
 

Valleys of Victoria Land
Scott Coast
Willett Range